Ion Izagirre Insausti (born 4 February 1989) is a Spanish professional road bicycle racer and cyclo-cross rider from the Basque Country, who currently rides for UCI WorldTeam . He is sometimes referred to as Jon Izagirre, to retain the correct pronunciation under Castilian orthography.

Career
Born in Ormaiztegi in the Basque Country, Izagirre comes from a family of professional cyclists, as both his father José Ramón and brother Gorka have competed professionally on the roads and in cyclo-cross. Having joined the  team – alongside brother Gorka – from the 2011 season onwards,

Izagirre won his first professional races in the spring of 2012; he won the individual time trial at the Vuelta a Asturias in April, before taking a victory during his Grand Tour début at the Giro d'Italia. During the sixteenth stage, Izagirre made a solo breakaway with  remaining, before winning the stage by sixteen seconds from his nearest competitor.

In 2015, Izagirre won the Tour de Pologne. He started the final stage sixth on general classification but overhauled race leader Sergio Henao and the others above him by virtue of a superior time trial performance on the rolling  circuit.

Izagirre won Stage 20 of the 2016 Tour de France in Morzine, after attacking on the wet descent from a three rider group that led over the final climb of Col de Joux Plane.

Izagirre moved to the newly formed  team for the 2017 season. He was the team's GC leader at the Tour de France, but crashed out on Stage 1, an individual time trial in Düsseldorf, suffering a lumbar fracture which ended his season.

In August 2018 it was announced that the brothers would join  in 2019.

Major results

2006
 3rd Junior race, National Cyclo-cross Championships
2008
 1st Gipuzkoa Individual Time Trial
 3rd Road race, National Under-23 Road Championships
2009
 1st Under-23 race, Basque Cyclo-cross Championships
 1st Memorial Angel Mantecon
 1st Stage 4 Bizkaiko Bira
 5th Overall Bidasoa Itzulia
2011
 4th Prueba Villafranca de Ordizia
2012
 1st Stage 16 Giro d'Italia
 1st Stage 2b (ITT) Vuelta a Asturias
 3rd Les Boucles du Sud Ardèche
 7th Overall Tour de Pologne
2013
 2nd Road race, National Road Championships
 2nd Overall Tour de Pologne
 4th Overall Tour Down Under
 9th Grand Prix Cycliste de Montréal
2014
 National Road Championships
1st  Road race
2nd Time trial
 2nd Overall Tour de Pologne
 4th Overall Vuelta a Andalucía
 6th Overall Tour of Britain
 8th Overall Tour de Romandie
2015
 1st  Overall Tour de Pologne
 2nd GP Miguel Induráin
 2nd Prueba Villafranca de Ordizia
 3rd  Team time trial, UCI Road World Championships
 3rd Overall Tour of the Basque Country
 10th Overall Volta ao Algarve
2016
 1st  Time trial, National Road Championships
 1st GP Miguel Induráin
 1st Stage 20 Tour de France
 2nd Overall Volta ao Algarve
 2nd Overall Tour de Suisse
1st Stage 8 (ITT)
 3rd Overall Tour de Romandie
1st Prologue
 4th Overall Volta a la Comunitat Valenciana
 5th Overall Paris–Nice
 8th Time trial, Olympic Games
 8th Overall Eneco Tour
 8th Grand Prix Cycliste de Montréal
2017
 3rd Road race, National Road Championships
 3rd Overall Tour of the Basque Country
 5th Overall Tour de Romandie
 5th Liège–Bastogne–Liège
 6th Overall Tour de Suisse
 6th Vuelta a Murcia
 7th Overall Paris–Nice
 7th Amstel Gold Race
2018
 3rd Time trial, National Road Championships
 3rd Overall Tour of the Basque Country
 4th Overall Paris–Nice
 6th Giro di Lombardia
 7th Clásica de San Sebastián
 9th Overall Vuelta a España
2019
 1st  Overall Tour of the Basque Country
 1st  Overall Volta a la Comunitat Valenciana
 1st Stage 8 Paris–Nice
 1st Stage 1 (TTT) Vuelta a España
 2nd Overall Vuelta a Andalucía
2020
 1st Stage 6 Vuelta a España
 4th Overall Vuelta a Andalucía
 7th Overall Volta a la Comunitat Valenciana
2021
 1st  Time trial, National Road Championships
 3rd Overall Paris–Nice
 7th Overall Critérium du Dauphiné
 7th Overall Tour de Romandie
 10th Overall Tour of the Basque Country
1st Stage 4
2022
 2nd Overall Tour of the Basque Country
1st Stage 6
 5th Time trial, National Road Championships
 6th Overall O Gran Camiño
 6th Overall Tour Poitou-Charentes en Nouvelle-Aquitaine
 7th Overall Paris–Nice
 7th GP Miguel Induráin

General classification results timeline

References

External links

 
 
 
 
 
 
 
 
 

1989 births
Living people
People from Goierri
Cyclists from the Basque Country (autonomous community)
Spanish Tour de France stage winners
Spanish Giro d'Italia stage winners
Spanish Vuelta a España stage winners
Cyclists at the 2016 Summer Olympics
Olympic cyclists of Spain
Sportspeople from Gipuzkoa
Cyclists at the 2020 Summer Olympics
Tour de Suisse stage winners